Astrocoeniidae is a family of stony corals. The family is distributed across the tropical and subtropical oceans worldwide.

Description
Astrocoeniids include both hermatypic and ahermatypic (reef-building) colonial corals, both with and without symbiotic zooxanthellae.

Species
The World Register of Marine Species includes the following genera and species in the family:

 Astrocoenia Milne Edwards & Haime, 1848 † 
 Astrocoenia blanfordi Duncan, 1880 †
 Astrocoenia cellulata Duncan, 1880 †
 Astrocoenia dachiardii Duncan, 1873 †
 Astrocoenia decaphylla Duncan, 1863 †
 Astrocoenia gibbosa Duncan, 1880 †
 Palauastrea Yabe & Sugiyama, 1941
 Palauastrea ramosa Yabe & Sugiyama, 1941 
 Stephanocoenia Milne Edwards & Haime, 1848
 Stephanocoenia incrustans Duncan, 1873 †
 Stephanocoenia intersepta (Lamarck, 1816) - synonym, Stephanocoenia michelini
 Stephanocoenia maxima Duncan, 1880 †
 Stephanocoenia microtuberculata Duncan, 1880 †
 Stephanocoenia reussi Duncan, 1868 †
 Stephanocoenia tenuis Duncan, 1863 †
 Stylocoenia Milne Edwards & Haime, 1849 †
 Stylocoenia maxima Duncan, 1880 †
 Stylocoenia ranikoti Duncan, 1880 †
 Stylocoenia taurinensis Michelin, 1842 †
 Stylocoeniella Yabe & Sugiyama, 1935
 Stylocoeniella armata (Ehrenberg, 1834) 
 Stylocoeniella cocosensis Veron, 1990
 Stylocoeniella guentheri (Bassett-Smith, 1890)
 Stylocoeniella nikei Benzoni & Pichon, 2004

References

Scleractinia
Cnidarian families